Espiral is the second studio album by Peruvian singer Anna Carina released on March 5, 2005 by the independent label 11 y 11 discos.

Background and Release
The album was released in 2005 and contains 10 songs all written by Anna Carina. This album is closer to the rock genre, exploring the sounds of acoustic and electric guitars, bass, and drums. However, she does not leave out pop and melodic ballads.

Promotion
Three songs were released as singles in order to promote the album. These songs were well received by the public and got Anna Carina to debut on international music chains such as MTV, HTV, and Ritmoson Latino as well  as the local television networks in Perú.

Track listing
All credits adapted from Anna Carina's Official Website and Apple Music.

Accolades
Premios Luces El Comercio

|-
| rowspan=2 style="text-align:center;"|2005
| style="text-align:center;"|Espiral
|style="text-align:center;"|Best Pop Album
|
|-

References

2005 albums
Spanish-language albums
Anna Carina albums